Lepturgantes is a genus of beetles in the family Cerambycidae, containing the following species:

 Lepturgantes candicans (Bates, 1863)
 Lepturgantes dilectus (Bates, 1863)
 Lepturgantes flavovittatus (Gilmour, 1959)
 Lepturgantes pacificus Gilmour, 1960
 Lepturgantes prolatus Monne & Monne, 2008
 Lepturgantes septemlineatus Gilmour, 1960
 Lepturgantes seriatus Monné, 1988
 Lepturgantes variegatus Gilmour, 1957

References

Acanthocinini